Monochroa nomadella is a moth of the family Gelechiidae. It is found from southern and central Europe to the southern Ural. It is also found in Mongolia. Records of M. nomadella from France and north-western Italy refer to Monochroa bronzella. The species prefers calcareous habitats.

The wingspan is 12–14 mm for males and about 8 mm for females. The wings of the females are reduced to some extent and it is thought they do not fly.

References

Moths described in 1868
Monochroa
Moths of Europe